The Natal Sugar Open Championships was a men's and women's international tennis tournament founded in 1962 in Durban, KwaZulu-Natal, South Africa as the Natal Sugar Championships. Its sponsorship name was the Hulett Natal Sugar Open Championships the tournament ended in 1981.

History
The Natal Championships were founded in 1884 and first staged Pietermaritzburg, KwaZulu-Natal, South Africa. In 1962 the Natal Sugar Championships were founded as part of the Sugar Circuit (f. 1962) of tennis tournaments from the 1960s to 1980s. This tournament was played alongside the Natal Championships. 

In 1980 the tournament was ended due to the withdraw of sponsorship by South African Sugar Association. The event was staged at Umhlali during the final four years of the women's event. In later years the tournament had switched to hard courts. The event was usually run between the middle two weeks of July each year.

References

Hard court tennis tournaments
Defunct tennis tournaments in South Africa